Cooper Robert Rush (born November 21, 1993) is an American football quarterback for the Dallas Cowboys of  the National Football League (NFL). He played college football at Central Michigan, and was signed by the Cowboys as an undrafted free agent in 2017.

Early years
Originally from Charlotte, Michigan, Rush attended Lansing Catholic High School in Lansing, Michigan, with an enrollment of just over 500 students, where he became a three-year starter at quarterback for the football team. He also played basketball and baseball (until his freshman year).

In 2010 and 2011, he led his team to back-to-back undefeated regular seasons. In 2011, he led his team to the state runner-up title. In the Division 5 regional championship game against Dowagiac Union High School, he set Michigan state records with 5 touchdown passes in one quarter and 8 for the game. The team would end up losing in the finals against Powers Catholic High School 26–56, even though he registered 300 passing yards and 3 touchdowns.

As a senior he received All-State, Associated Press’ Michigan Division 5/6 Player of the Year and ESPN’s Michigan Gatorade Player of the Year honors.

He finished his high school career throwing for 7,248 passing yards (455-for-734, 62 percent), 80 passing touchdowns, 1,438 rushing yards and 27 rushing touchdowns. A 3-star recruit, Cooper Rush only received scholarship offers from Central Michigan and Toledo, but received preferred walk-on offers from Michigan, Michigan State, Northwestern, and Western Michigan.

College career
In his redshirt season at Central Michigan, he was named the school’s Scout Team Player of the Year. As a freshman, although he began the season as the third-string quarterback, he was named the starter by the third game, after Cody Kater was injured (collarbone fracture) and his backup Alex Niznak couldn't move the offense against the University of New Hampshire. In that contest he came in the second quarter and helped engineer a 24–21 come from behind victory, where he tallied 326 passing yards and 3 touchdowns, tying the school record for the longest in history (97 yards). He would never relinquish the position or miss a start after the game.

As a sophomore, he played in the 2014 Bahamas Bowl against Western Kentucky. By the middle of the third quarter, his team had fallen behind 49–14, but scored 4 unanswered touchdowns and were down by only 7 points near the end of the fourth quarter. With one second remaining on the contest, Central Michigan had the ball on their own 25 yard line. The would-be final play started with a 45-yard Hail Mary pass from Rush to wide receiver Jesse Kroll. As Kroll was being tackled he lateraled the ball to teammate Deon Butler, who ran 20 yards before lateraling to Courtney Williams. With no space to run, Williams made a quick third lateral pass to leading receiver Titus Davis who ran the final 13 yards, scoring a touchdown that would have tied the game with a kicked extra point and sent the game into overtime, but instead Central Michigan attempted a two-point conversion for the win, which was unsuccessful. Had the try succeeded, it would have marked the largest comeback in bowl history and tied the largest comeback in any Division I game. His seven touchdown passes set an all-time record for all bowl games.

His best season came as a junior in 2015. Through the first 13 games he had 3,703 passing yards, which was a new school single-season record. He completed 66.3 percent of his passes for 3,848 total passing yards, 25 touchdowns, and 11 interceptions.

As a senior, his production dropped to 3,540 passing yards, 23 touchdowns, but with 16 interceptions and a low 59.8 completion percentage. Against Oklahoma State University, the game sparked controversy after the officials made an incorrect call that would eventually give Central Michigan the win. Oklahoma State threw the ball away to end the game and received a penalty for intentional grounding. Under college football rules, the game would have ended and Oklahoma State would have won the game. However, the officials gave Central Michigan an untimed down, and Rush threw a 51-yard Hail Mary pass to wide receiver Jesse Kroll, who made a lateral to fellow receiver Corey Willis at the 12-yard line, running for a touchdown with no time remaining for a 30–27 win. The team lost 55–10 to Tulsa in the 2016 Miami Beach Bowl at the end of the season.

He finished his college career with 49 straight starts, 12,894 passing yards (12 yards short of Dan LeFevour school and conference record) and 90 touchdowns.

College statistics

Professional career
Coming out of Central Michigan, Rush was projected by the majority of NFL draft experts and analysts to be a seventh round pick or a priority undrafted free agent. On December 6, 2016, it was announced that Rush had accepted his invitation to the East–West Shrine Game. On January 21, 2017, Rush performed in the East–West Shrine Game for the East and completed 11 of 17 pass attempts for 97 yards in a 10–3 loss to the West.

He received an invitation to the NFL combine and performed almost all of the required drills except for the bench press. He had an underwhelming lackluster performance and had some of the lowest marks at the combine. On March 20, 2017, Rush participated at Central Michigan's pro day and chose to attempt the vertical jump, broad jump, short shuttle, and three-cone drill once again. He gave a slower time in the three-cone drill (7.28), but was able to have better results in the vertical (30"), broad (8'11"), and short shuttle (4.46). Rush was ranked the 14th best quarterback prospect in the draft by NFLDraftScout.com.

Dallas Cowboys

2017
Rush was signed as an undrafted free agent by the Dallas Cowboys after the 2017 NFL Draft on May 12. As a rookie, he initially competed with Zac Dysert in training camp for the job as the third-string quarterback. After Dysert suffered a herniated disc, the Cowboys signed Luke McCown to replace him on the roster.

Following multiple productive preseason performances in the Hall of Fame Game and the next two contests, he began to share second-team reps in practice with backup quarterback Kellen Moore before the preseason game against the Oakland Raiders. During the contest, he was given most of the time with the second-team offense and completed 12 of his 13 attempts for 115 yards and two touchdowns in a comeback 24–20 victory. He finished the preseason with a total of 38 pass completions out of 51 attempts, 398 passing yards, and six touchdown passes with no interceptions. Head coach Jason Garrett named Rush the Cowboys' third quarterback on their depth chart, behind Dak Prescott and Moore. Rush did not dress for the first five games and was a healthy scratch.

Rush was promoted to second-string for the sixth game of the season, with Moore being released and signed to the Cowboys’ practice squad. In Week 7, in the 40–10 victory over the San Francisco 49ers, he appeared late in the game in relief of Prescott. He was 1-of-3 passing for 2 yards and had 2 rushes for 13 yards in his NFL debut.

2018
In 2018, he was the backup at quarterback from the start of organized team activities, as he never received any strong competition from rookie Mike White. He only played in the sixth game against the Jacksonville Jaguars, closing out a 40–7 win in the fourth quarter, where he only handed the ball to the running backs.

2019
In 2019, he wasn't challenged for the backup quarterback role, so the Cowboys decided to keep only two quarterbacks on the roster, releasing White at the end of the preseason. He only played in the season opener against the New York Giants and in the fourteenth game against the Los Angeles Rams. He did not have any pass attempts while closing out the two wins in the fourth quarter.

2020
On March 18, 2020, Rush re-signed with the Cowboys on a one-year restricted free agent tender. On May 4, Rush was waived by the Cowboys after the team signed former Cincinnati Bengals quarterback Andy Dalton.

New York Giants
On May 5, 2020, Rush was claimed off waivers by the New York Giants, reuniting with offensive coordinator Jason Garrett, who was his head coach with the Cowboys. On September 5, 2020, he was waived and signed to the practice squad the next day. On September 29, 2020, Rush was released from the Giants practice squad to make room for another former Cowboys quarterback (Clayton Thorson).

Dallas Cowboys (second stint)

2021
On October 31, 2020, Rush was signed to the Dallas Cowboys' practice squad, to provide depth after starter Dak Prescott suffered a season-ending ankle injury. He was elevated to the active roster on November 7 for the team's week 9 game against the Pittsburgh Steelers, and reverted to the practice squad after the game. He signed a reserve/future contract with the Cowboys on January 4, 2021. He beat out Garrett Gilbert and Ben DiNucci to be the backup QB for Dallas in the 2021 NFL season.

Rush was named the starter for the Cowboys Week 8 game against the Minnesota Vikings after Prescott was out with a calf injury. It was Rush's first start since entering the NFL. He passed for 325 yards, 2 touchdowns, and an interception, and led a comeback drive that he ended by throwing a touchdown to Amari Cooper in the final minute of a 20–16 Dallas victory.

2022
On August 30, 2022, Rush was waived by the Cowboys and signed to the practice squad the next day. He was signed to the active roster on September 17, 2022, to be the starter following an injury to Dak Prescott. He made his first start of the season in Week 2 against the Cincinnati Bengals, where he threw for 235 yards and a touchdown in the 20–17 win.

In his second start of the season against the New York Giants in Week 3, Rush threw for 225 yards and 1 touchdown in a 23–16 win. In Week 4 against the Washington Commanders, in his third straight start of the season, Rush completed 15 of 27 pass attempts for 223 yards, with 2 passing touchdowns, 0 interceptions and a passer rating of 107.5 in the 25–10 win. With the victory, Rush became the first quarterback in Dallas Cowboys history to win his first five starts. In Week 5 against the Los Angeles Rams, Rush completed 10 of 16 passes for 102 yards with zero touchdowns or interceptions, in a 22–10 win. This was Rush's 4th straight start and win during the season. After four starts in the season, Rush had the 5th highest QBR in the NFL at 66.9. In Week 6 against the Philadelphia Eagles, Rush completed 18 of 38 pass attempts for 181 yards with one touchdown and three interceptions in a 26–17 loss. Rush returned to the backup role when Prescott returned in Week 7.

2023
On March 17, 2023, Rush re-signed with the Cowboys on a two-year contract worth $6 million.

NFL career statistics

Personal life
Rush is married to Lauryn Rush. They have one daughter together.

References

External links

 Central Michigan bio
 Pro Football Reference page

Living people
1993 births
People from Charlotte, Michigan
Sportspeople from Lansing, Michigan
Players of American football from Michigan
American football quarterbacks
Central Michigan Chippewas football players
Dallas Cowboys players
New York Giants players